Swift Current—Maple Creek (previously known as Swift Current) was a federal electoral district in Saskatchewan, Canada, that was represented in the House of Commons of Canada from 1917 to 1988.

This riding was created in 1914 as “Swift Current” from parts of Moose Jaw riding.

The name of the electoral district was changed to “Swift Current—Maple Creek” in 1953.

The electoral district was abolished in 1987 when it was merged into Swift Current—Maple Creek—Assiniboia riding.

Members of Parliament 

This riding elected the following Members of Parliament:

Ira Eugene Argue, Unionist (1917–1921)
Arthur John Lewis, Progressive (1921–1925)
Charles Edward Bothwell, Liberal (1925–1940)
Roy Theodore Graham, Liberal (1940–1945)
Thomas J. Bentley, Co-operative Commonwealth Federation (1945–1949)
Harry B. Whiteside, Liberal (1949–1953)
Irvin Studer, Liberal (1953–1958)
Jack McIntosh, Progressive Conservative (1958–1972)
Frank Hamilton, Progressive Conservative (1972–1984)
Geoff Wilson, Progressive Conservative (1984–1988)

Election results

External links 

Former federal electoral districts of Saskatchewan